Thomas J. Lander (1875 – 1956) was an English footballer who played for Burslem Port Vale at the turn of the 20th century.

Career
Lander joined Burslem Port Vale from Talke Alexandra in March 1897. He played 16 Second Division games in the 1898–99, but only appeared eight times in the league during the 1899–1900 campaign. He played 13 league and FA Cup matches in the 1900–01 season, and scored his first goal in the English Football League on 1 December, in a 3–2 win over Barnsley at the Athletic Ground. He claimed another goal on 29 December, in a 3–2 defeat to Birmingham City at Muntz Street. He played 25 league games in the 1901–02 season, before being released at the end of the season.

Career statistics
Source:

References

1875 births
1956 deaths
Sportspeople from Burslem
English footballers
Association football midfielders
Port Vale F.C. players
Midland Football League players
English Football League players